Freddy Mezones (born 24 September 1987) is a Venezuelan sprinter specialising in the 400 metres. He competed in the 4 × 400 metres relay at the 2013 World Championships without qualifying for the final.

His personal best in the event is 45.53 seconds (Barinas 2015).

Personal bests
400 m: 45.53 –  Barinas, 17 April 2015
800 m: 1:52.53 –  Barquisimeto, 19 June 2010

Competition record

References

External links
Tilastopaja biography

1987 births
Living people
Venezuelan male sprinters
Athletes (track and field) at the 2015 Pan American Games
World Athletics Championships athletes for Venezuela
Athletes (track and field) at the 2016 Summer Olympics
Olympic athletes of Venezuela
South American Games silver medalists for Venezuela
South American Games bronze medalists for Venezuela
South American Games medalists in athletics
Competitors at the 2014 South American Games
Athletes (track and field) at the 2018 South American Games
Central American and Caribbean Games silver medalists for Venezuela
Competitors at the 2010 Central American and Caribbean Games
Competitors at the 2014 Central American and Caribbean Games
Central American and Caribbean Games medalists in athletics
Pan American Games competitors for Venezuela
Sportspeople from Caracas
20th-century Venezuelan people
21st-century Venezuelan people